The Saudi Pro League clubs in the AFC Champions League.This details the participation and performances in the competition since its based at 2002 as a result of the merger between the Asian Club Championship, the [[world cup and Champions league].

Overview

Results
Q : Qualified, PO : Qualifying play-off, GS : Group stage, R16 : Round of 16, QF : Quarter-finals, SF : Semi-finals, RU : Runners-up, W : Winners

Statistics by club

This table does not include qualifying round matches.

Statistics by season

Statistics by Saudi club

Al-Hilal

Al-Ittihad

Al-Shabab

Al-Ahli

Al-Ettifaq

Al-Nassr

Al-Fateh

Statistics against each other

 In the following table, the results of 4 meetings between Saudi teams have been played:

Statistics by opponents league
The following statistics does not include qualifying round matches.

A-League

Chinese Super League

Iran Pro League

Iraqi Premier League

J1 League

K League Classic

Kuwaiti Premier League

Qatar Stars League

Syrian Premier League

UAE Arabian Gulf League

Uzbek League

Finals

See also 
 Australian clubs in the AFC Champions League
 Chinese clubs in the AFC Champions League
 Indian football clubs in Asian competitions
 Indonesian football clubs in Asian competitions
 Iranian clubs in the AFC Champions League
 Iraqi clubs in the AFC Champions League
 Japanese clubs in the AFC Champions League
 Myanmar clubs in the AFC Champions League
 Qatari clubs in the AFC Champions League
 South Korean clubs in the AFC Champions League
 Thai clubs in the AFC Champions League
 Vietnamese clubs in the AFC Champions League

References

External links
 AFC Champions League Official website
 AFC Champions League on RSSSF

Saudi Arabian football clubs in international competitions
Football clubs in the AFC Champions League